Jonca Creek is a stream in Ste. Genevieve County in the U.S. state of Missouri. It is a tributary to the River aux Vases.

The source area is one quarter mile east of Missouri Route 32 and the stream flows generally to the east. The stream flows past the north side of Hawn State Park and south of the community of Millers.

Jonca Creek most likely has the name of a pioneer citizen.

See also
List of rivers of Missouri

References

Rivers of Ste. Genevieve County, Missouri
Rivers of Missouri